Daisy, Princess of Pless (Mary Theresa Olivia; née Cornwallis-West; 28 June 1873 – 29 June 1943) was a noted society beauty in the Edwardian period, and during her marriage a member of one of the wealthiest European noble families. Daisy and her husband Prince Hans Heinrich XV were the owners of large estates and coal mines in Silesia (now in Poland) which brought the Hochbergs enormous fortune.

Early life 

Born Mary Theresa Olivia Cornwallis-West at Ruthin Castle in Denbighshire, Wales, she was the daughter of Col. William Cornwallis-West (1835–1917) and his wife, Mary "Patsy" FitzPatrick (1856–1920). Her father was a patrilineal great-grandson of John West, 2nd Earl De La Warr. Her mother was a daughter of Reverend Frederick FitzPatrick, a descendant of Barnaby Fitzpatrick, 1st Baron Upper Ossory (and thus the Kings of Osraige) and Lady Olivia Taylour, daughter of the 2nd Marquess of Headfort.

Her sister Constance  was also a famous beauty and wife of one of the richest men of the world, Hugh Grosvenor, 2nd Duke of Westminster and their brother George Cornwallis-West was the second husband of Lady Randolph Churchill, mother of Sir Winston Churchill.

Marriage 
Daisy married Hans Heinrich XV von Hochberg at St. Margaret's in Westminster on 8 December 1891. However, as the Cornwallis-West family was impoverished, the Hochbergs were obliged to pay and organise the wedding. Notable witnesses were Edward, Prince of Wales (later King Edward VII) and his wife Princess Alexandra of Denmark.

During her marriage, Daisy, known in German as the Fürstin von Pless, became a social reformer and militated for peace with her friends William II, German Emperor and King Edward VII of the United Kingdom. During World War I she served as a nurse.

Diaries 
After her divorce at Berlin on 12 December 1922 she published a series of memoirs that were widely read in the United Kingdom, the United States, and, in the German language, in Continental Europe.'The Private Diaries of Princess Daisy of Pless – 1873–1914, edited by Major Desmond Chapman-Huston, were first published in London by John Murray in 1931. This was the second selection from her diaries and, according to his introduction were from a series of diaries totalling 600,000 words. The diaries describe the Princess's life as a member of the European aristocracy, and include sometimes frank descriptions of significant pre-war political and social figures.

Personal life and family 
On 8 December 1891, in London, she married Hans Heinrich XV, 3th Prince of Pless, Count of Hochberg, Baron of Fürstenstein (1861–1938), one of the wealthiest heirs in the German Empire, becoming châtelaine of Fürstenstein Castle and Pless Castle in Silesia.

The couple had four children:

 Daughter (25 February 1893 – 11 March 1893).
 Hans Heinrich XVII William Albert Edward (2 February 1900 – 26 January 1984), 4th Prince of Pless, Count von Hochberg and Baron of Fürstenstein. Married twice but had no issue.
 Alexander Frederick William George Conrad Ernest Maximilian (1 February 1905 – 22 February 1984), 5th Prince of Pless, Count von Hochberg and Baron of Fürstenstein. Unmarried and childless.
 Bolko Conrad Frederick (23 September 1910 – 22 June 1936), who later caused a scandal by marrying his stepmother Clotilde de Silva y Gonzáles de Candamo (19 July 1898 – 12 December 1978), daughter of the 10th Marquis de Arcicóllar (and Hans Heinrich XV's second wife). Father of Bolko, 6th Prince. 

Hans Heinrich married as his second wife, at London on 25 January 1925, Clotilde de Silva y González de Candamo (1898–1978), daughter of José de Silva y Borchgrave d'Altena, Marquis de Arcicollar. This marriage produced two children, and was annulled in 1934. Subsequently, Clotilde married her stepson, Bolko, and was the mother of Daisy's and Hans Heinrich's only grandchildren.

Daisy's brother George in 1900 married Jennie Churchill, the mother of Winston Churchill, as his first wife, and after their divorce married in 1914 Mrs. Patrick Campbell, the actress, as his second. Her sister, Constance, married in 1901 Hugh Grosvenor, 2nd Duke of Westminster, and after their divorce she married in 1920 James FitzPatrick Lewes.

The Princess of Pless was a Dame of the Order of Theresa of Bavaria and of the Order of Isabella the Catholic of Spain, and was awarded the German Red Cross Decoration.

Death 
Daisy, Princess of Pless, died in 1943 in relative poverty at Waldenburg, Silesia (now Wałbrzych, Poland). She was buried in Hochberg family mausoleum.  Her grave had been plundered and her remains had been desecrated by russian Red Army soldiers in 1945.

Ancestry

Notes 
Citations  

 
Sources
 
 
 
  republished 1950

External links 
 Exhibition photographs: Daisy of Pless: The Happy Years
 Castle Pless

1873 births
1943 deaths
British socialites
Female wartime nurses
German socialites
German people of English descent
German people of Welsh descent
People from Pszczyna
People from Ruthin
People from Wałbrzych
Princesses by marriage
Silesian nobility
Welsh memoirists
Female nurses in World War I
FitzPatrick dynasty